Szyszków may refer to the following places:
Szyszków, Lublin Voivodeship (east Poland)
Szyszków, Opole Voivodeship (south-west Poland)
Szyszków, Silesian Voivodeship (south Poland)